Region 1 or Region I can refer to:

 Region 1, a DVD region code
 Region 1, Northwest Territories, a Statistics Canada census division
Northeastern United States, Region 1 for the US Census Bureau
 Region 1, one of the health regions of Canada managed by Horizon Health Network
 Former Region 1 (Johannesburg), an administrative district in the city of Johannesburg, South Africa, from 2000 to 2006
 Region 1, an administrative region in Iran
 Tarapacá Region, Chile
 Ilocos Region, Philippines

Region name disambiguation pages